Bechelbronn is a historic home located near Victoria, Lunenburg County, Virginia. The original house was built about 1840, with additions made about 1851, and about 1900.  It is a rambling two-story brick dwelling with vernacular Federal and Greek Revival style details.  Also on the property is the contributing Perry family cemetery.

It was listed on the National Register of Historic Places in 2008.

References

Houses on the National Register of Historic Places in Virginia
Federal architecture in Virginia
Greek Revival houses in Virginia
Houses completed in 1840
Houses in Lunenburg County, Virginia
National Register of Historic Places in Lunenburg County, Virginia